Ophionereis is a genus of echinoderms belonging to the family Ophionereididae.

The genus has almost cosmopolitan distribution.

Species:

Ophionereis albomaculata 
Ophionereis amphilogus 
Ophionereis andamanensis 
Ophionereis annulata 
Ophionereis australis 
Ophionereis commutabilis 
Ophionereis degeneri 
Ophionereis diabloensis 
Ophionereis dolabriformis 
Ophionereis dubia 
Ophionereis eurybrachiplax 
Ophionereis fasciata 
Ophionereis fusca 
Ophionereis hexactis 
Ophionereis intermedia 
Ophionereis lineata 
Ophionereis novaezelandiae 
Ophionereis olivacea 
Ophionereis perplexa 
Ophionereis porrecta 
Ophionereis reticulata 
Ophionereis sasakii 
Ophionereis schayeri 
Ophionereis semoni 
Ophionereis sexradia 
Ophionereis squamulosa 
Ophionereis sykesi 
Ophionereis thryptica 
Ophionereis tigris 
Ophionereis variegata 
Ophionereis vittata 
Ophionereis vivipara

References

Ophiuroidea genera
Ophionereididae